Arví is the second and last station on line L of the Medellín Metro. It is located in the Santa Elena village of Medellín. It was inaugurated in early 2010, along with Arví park, which caters to tourists. It uses the same metrocable system as lines J and K.

References

External links
 Official site of Medellín Metro 

Medellín Metro stations
Railway stations opened in 2010
2010 establishments in Colombia